This list is of the Cultural Properties of Japan designated in the category of  for the Prefecture of Kumamoto.

National Cultural Properties
As of 1 February 2015, one Important Cultural Property has been designated, being of national significance.

Prefectural Cultural Properties
Properties designated at a prefectural level include:

Municipal Cultural Properties
Properties designated at a municipal level include:

See also
 Cultural Properties of Japan
 List of National Treasures of Japan (historical materials)
 List of Historic Sites of Japan (Kumamoto)
 Higo Province

References

Cultural Properties,historical materials
Historical materials,Kumamoto